The Mike Kable Young Gun Award (also called the Mike Kable Rookie of the Year) is an annual motor racing award honouring the achievements of a rookie driver under the age of 30 who competes in either the Supercars Championship or the second-tier Super2 Series. Tony Cochrane, the chairman of the championship's organising body Australian Vee Eight Supercar Company (AVESCO), instigated the accolade in June 2000. It is named after Mike Kable, an Australian motoring journalist, motorsport publicist, and mentor to young racing drivers. The award is presented to the rookie driver adjudged to have performed the best over the course of their first season in either championship following a vote by a panel of motorsport experts. The recipient receives a sponsorship grant of A$15,000 to help develop themselves. The winner is announced at the series' end-of-season gala in Sydney.

The inaugural winner was Matthew White in 2000. The following year, the Stone Brothers Racing driver Marcos Ambrose won the award. Ambrose, James Courtney, Rick Kelly, Scott McLaughlin and Mark Winterbottom are the five recipients who have gone on to win either the Supercars Championship and/or the Bathurst 1000 in their careers. Australian drivers have won 20 times and New Zealanders once. No one has won more than once; drivers from the second-tier championship have been honoured 14 times and Supercars competitors have won on 7 occasions. The 2022 recipient was the Super2 Rookie of the Year winner, Matthew Payne, who drove for Grove Racing in the 2022 Super2 Series.

Winners

Statistics

See also
 Barry Sheene Medal

Notes

References

External links
 

Supercars Championship
Auto racing trophies and awards
Australian sports trophies and awards